Telmatology is a branch of physical geography concerned with the study of wetlands, such as marshes or swamps.

References

Wetlands
Physical geography
Environmental science